This is a Chinese name; the family name is Chen. In the stage name, the surname is Kwan.

Terri Kwan (born 2 July 1976) is a Taiwanese actress, model, singer and author.

Early life
Kwan was born in Tokyo, Japan. She has a sister and two Yorkshire Terriers called Dodo and Momo. She graduated from New York University with a master's degree in arts administration. In 2001 she began appearing in advertisements and endorsing numerous products, like Tobaby Hair Products and JC Sunglasses.

Career
Kwan starring regularly in both films and television series. In 2002, she got one of her first leading role in the Taiwanese film Drop Me a Cat appearing alongside Japanese actor Shinji Takeda. She has also played a part in the first Chinese-language Asian film ever from Warner Bros., Turn Left, Turn Right, as the supporting role of Ruby. The film also starred Takeshi Kaneshiro and Gigi Leung. For her role, she was nominated for the Best Supporting Actress award at the 40th Golden Horse Award.

In 2007, she appeared alongside Peter Ho in My DNA Says I Love You, where they played lovers. Then, in 2009, she appeared in the television series Starlit, shot in Shanghai, together with Jerry Yan. She played a female patient who suffered from the rare disease of amyotrophic lateral sclerosis. In the same year, she also starred in another Taiwanese film Prince of Tears, which premiered at the 66th Venice Film Festival. She sat as a jury member for the 14th (2009) Pusan International Film Festival's "New Currents" section. Recently, she has also published her own book. She was slated to play the role of Soong Mei-ling in the television series Untold Stories of 1949, with filming starting late 2010.

Filmography

Film

Television series

References

External links

 
Terri Kwan at chinesemov.com

1976 births
Living people
Taiwanese film actresses
Taiwanese television actresses
21st-century Taiwanese actresses
21st-century Taiwanese singers
Actresses from Tokyo
University of the Arts (Philadelphia) alumni
New York University alumni
21st-century Taiwanese women singers